Devon wrestling is a type of wrestling that was 
popular in the nineteenth century. The Devonshire fashion of wrestling allows hardened footwear to be worn and kicking intended to disable the opponent.

It has similarities to Cornish wrestling but it was reputed to focus more on foot moves and less on throwing.  In the eighteenth and nineteenth century many Devon wrestlers used to wear "baked" boots when wrestling, which could cause serious injury to opponents (on rare occasions leading to death).

The best known champion Devon wrestler is Abraham Cann of Colebrooke, Devon. Cann was the Devon champion and faced the Cornish champion James Polkinghorne in a match in Morice Town, now in Plymouth, in 1826, watched by a crowd of 17,000 (after some dispute the match was declared a draw). Cann had defeated John Jordan, Flower, Wreyford, Simon Webber, and the other good wrestlers in Devon, and carried off the prizes at many of the places where he became a competitor.

References

Folk wrestling styles
Culture in Devon
Sports originating in England
European martial arts
Wrestling in England